Artim Položani or Pollozhani (born 25 June 1982) is a Macedonian professional footballer of Albanian descent who plays for Albanian club Skënderbeu Korçë.

Club career
Položani joined TuS Koblenz in the German 2. Bundesliga on a three-year contract in June 2007. After recording only two appearances in the first part of 2007–08 season, he was sent on loan at Dinamo Tirana of Albanian Superliga. He played 15 matches and scored 3 goals as Dinamo won the championship. After his loan ended, Položani returned in Macedonia where he signed with Vardar for the 2008–09 season. On 16 June 2010, Položani signed with Russian side FC Krylya Sovetov.

On 7 September 2017, Flamurtari Vlorë manager Shpëtim Duro confirmed that Položani is going to play for the club in the 2017–18 season. The transfer was made official five days later, where he was presented and was given squad number 4. He made his Albanian Superliga appearance on 9 September in the opening matchday against Skënderbeu Korçë which finished in a 0–2 away defeat. Položani concluded his first season by playing 31 league games as the team finished in 6th place despite challenging for the title in mid-season. On 5 July 2018, he signed a new contract for the upcoming season. Položani was named team captain in the beginning of February 2019 following the departure of Tomislav Bušić. His first match as the official captain was the 2–1 home defeat to Kukësi; he scored his first Flamurtari goal with a header in the first half which temporarily leveled the figures. In the second half, he scored an overhead kick, which was disallowed in controversial fashion for dangerous play, which lead Albanian media to draw comparisons to the goal Cristiano Ronaldo scored against Juventus in the 2017–18 UEFA Champions League. During the same match, he was also injured during a duel which resulted in him losing two teeth.

International career
He made his senior debut for Macedonia in a February 2007 friendly match against Albania and has earned a total of 14 caps, scoring no goals. His final international was a March 2015 friendly against Australia.

Honours

Club
Dinamo Tirana
Albanian Superliga: 2007–08

Shkëndija
Macedonian Football Cup: 2015–16

Individual
Macedonian Domestic Footballer of the Year: 2006

References

External links

Artim Položani at MacedonianFootball.com

1982 births
Living people
People from Struga Municipality
Albanian footballers from North Macedonia
Association football midfielders
Macedonian footballers
North Macedonia international footballers
KF Apolonia Fier players
FK Dinamo Tirana players
FK Bashkimi players
KF Shkëndija players
FK Makedonija Gjorče Petrov players
TuS Koblenz players
FK Vardar players
NK Croatia Sesvete players
FC Torpedo Moscow players
Flamurtari Vlorë players
KF Skënderbeu Korçë players
Kategoria Superiore players
Macedonian First Football League players
2. Bundesliga players
Croatian Football League players
Russian First League players
Macedonian expatriate footballers
Expatriate footballers in Albania
Macedonian expatriate sportspeople in Albania
Expatriate footballers in Germany
Macedonian expatriate sportspeople in Germany
Expatriate footballers in Croatia
Macedonian expatriate sportspeople in Croatia
Expatriate footballers in Russia
Macedonian expatriate sportspeople in Russia
PFC Krylia Sovetov Samara players